The New Daisy Theatre is a music venue located on Beale Street in Memphis, Tennessee. It plays host to both local and national acts, as well the site of rental events.

The theater opened in 1936 and has featured artists such as John Lee Hooker, Gatemouth Brown, Jerry Lee Lewis, Al Green, Sam and Dave, Bob Dylan, Alex Chilton, the Cramps, Stevie Ray Vaughan, Kid Memphis, Son Lewis, Nirvana, Prince, Rufus Thomas, Justin Timberlake, Nelly, the Cult and Oasis, Ty Dolla $ign, J. Cole, Machine Gun Kelly, and All Time Low, among others.

Bob Dylan used the venue to record a video of a song from his Grammy-winning CD Time Out of Mind.

History 
In 1942, Paul and Sam Zerilla and their business partner, Joe Maceri, the owners of the original Daisy Theatre, opened the New Daisy Theatre at 330 Beale Street. The Zerillas and Maceri wanted to create a bigger performance space for popular acts.

In the first few decades after its opening, the New Daisy Theatre was primarily a movie theatre, but sometimes hosted live acts.

It had fallen into disrepair by the 1970s, and while several buildings around it were demolished, both the Old Daisy and New Daisy remained intact.

In the early 1980s, boxing promoter Mike Glenn began leasing the New Daisy and hosting matches. While boxing helped the theatre financially at the beginning, eventually Glenn began to host concerts, largely of rock music, which drew in more money than the boxing, although the latter continued. Glenn sold the New Daisy in Nov of 2014 hosting John Hiatt as the last national act under his storied tenure which hosted many legendary artists and nationally televised boxing matches.

In 2014 Steve Adelman and J.W. Gibson purchased the F.G.H. Corporation and the New Daisy Theatre, and in 2015 they invested $500,000 to renovate it. The renovation added a new floor, VIP areas, new bars, as well as new sound and lighting systems. Acts booked for the first two month included Seether, Drive-By Truckers, Joey Bada$$, Public Image Ltd., Everclear, and Steve Earle.

In 2019, Adelman was charged with writing a fraudulent check to former owner Mike Glenn. The charges were then dropped by police due to false claims. Adelman claimed that he intended to file a civil suit against Glenn “to address the wrongful conduct and hold parties accountable for their actions.”

Spearheaded by Jon Shivers, with the Downtown Memphis Commission, The New Daisy Theatre will be reopening in 2023 and will play host to local & national touring acts as well as corporate & private events.

Notable Performers 
Red Hot Chili Peppers - 1989
Alanis Morissette - 1995
TOOL - 1996 (December 14)
Prince - 1997
Bob Dylan - 1999
They Might Be Giants - 2002 
Justin Timberlake - 2003
Dierks Bentley - 2005
Zac Brown Band - 2009
Childish Gambino - 2011
All Time Low - 2011
Machine Gun Kelly - 2016
J. Cole - 2017 
Ty Dolla $ign - 2018

References

External links 
 Cinematreasures.com
 Beale Street In Memphis, January 1, 1944

Buildings and structures in Memphis, Tennessee
Culture of Memphis, Tennessee
Tourist attractions in Memphis, Tennessee
Music venues in Tennessee
Cinemas and movie theaters in Tennessee
Theatres completed in 1936
Historic district contributing properties in Tennessee
National Register of Historic Places in Memphis, Tennessee
Theatres on the National Register of Historic Places in Tennessee
1936 establishments in Tennessee